Siddharth Chimanbhai Patel is an Indian politician from Gujarat. He was a MLA of Indian National Congress from Dabhoi from 1998 to 2002 and from 2007 to 2012. He is a son of former Chief Minister of Gujarat, Chimanbhai Patel. He is ex-president of GPCC.

He lost in the 2012 Gujarat Legislative Assembly election and again in 2017 from Dabhoi. He lost against Bharatiya Janata Party candidate Shailesh Mehta in 2017.

References

External links
Official Website

Gujarat MLAs 2007–2012
Indian National Congress politicians from Gujarat
Politicians from Ahmedabad
Year of birth missing (living people)
Living people